Andy Manuel Marte (October 21, 1983 – January 22, 2017) was a Dominican professional baseball third baseman. He played in Major League Baseball (MLB) for the Atlanta Braves, Cleveland Indians, and Arizona Diamondbacks. He also played in the KBO League for the KT Wiz. On January 22, 2017, Marte was killed in a car crash in the Dominican Republic.

Career

Atlanta Braves 
Marte signed as a free agent with the Atlanta Braves at the age of 16 in 2000, and succeeded at every level of the farm system. He was selected to appear in the All-Star Futures Game in 2003 and 2004. In 2005 Marte hit .275 with 20 home runs and 74 runs batted in (RBIs) in 109 games in Triple-A, but hit only .140 in 57 at bats with the Braves, and was blocked at third base by Chipper Jones, who had recently signed a contract extension.

Cleveland Indians 
Marte was traded by the Atlanta Braves on December 8, 2005, to the Boston Red Sox for shortstop Édgar Rentería and cash considerations. Later that off-season, on January 27, 2006, the Red Sox traded him to the Cleveland Indians along with relief pitcher Guillermo Mota, catcher Kelly Shoppach, Randy Newsom, and cash considerations for center fielder Coco Crisp, catcher Josh Bard, and relief pitcher David Riske.  While a member of Cleveland's Triple-A affiliate Buffalo Bisons in the summer of 2006, Marte was selected for the Triple-A All-Star Game played at Fifth Third Field in Toledo, Ohio, where he also won the Home Run Derby.

Marte initially received little playing time with the Indians, but after the Indians traded Casey Blake on July 26, 2008, he had the third base job to himself. He batted .221 in 80 games, and the Indians traded for Mark DeRosa after the 2008 season to play that position in 2009.

On February 19, 2009, Marte was designated for assignment by the Indians to make room for newly acquired relief pitcher Juan Salas. Marte cleared waivers and was sent outright to the Columbus Clippers of the Class AAA International League on February 25.

In 82 games for the Clippers, he batted .327 with 18 home runs. Following the trade of Ryan Garko on July 27, Marte was recalled to the Indians. On July 29, 2010, Marte made his first pitching appearance for the Cleveland Indians, pitching a perfect inning with one strikeout of Nick Swisher.

On November 5, 2010, Marte was outrighted to Triple-A Columbus, removing him from the 40-man roster, thus making him eligible to become a free agent.

Return to the minor leagues 
On December 1, 2010, Marte signed a minor league deal with the Pittsburgh Pirates of Major League Baseball. He played for the Indianapolis Indians of the Class AAA International League in 2011.

Unable to find a contract, Marte sat out the 2012 season. He began the 2013 season with the York Revolution of the Atlantic League of Professional Baseball, an independent baseball league. Marte signed a minor league deal with the Los Angeles Angels of Anaheim on August 6, 2013. He played for the Salt Lake Bees of the Class AAA Pacific Coast League.

Arizona Diamondbacks 
Marte signed a minor league deal with the Arizona Diamondbacks on December 13, 2013. He began the 2014 season with the Reno Aces of the Class AAA Pacific Coast League.

The Diamondbacks promoted Marte to the major leagues on July 31, 2014, and homered in his first at-bat with the team, a pinch-hit against Jeff Locke of the Pittsburgh Pirates. He was designated for assignment on August 7, when the Diamondbacks promoted Jake Lamb. Marte returned to Reno and elected free agency in October 2014.

Marte's final plate appearance was a pinch-hit appearance in the 9th inning of a game on August 6, 2014 against the Kansas City Royals; Marte and the Royals' starter that day, Yordano Ventura, both died in unrelated car accidents on the same day in 2017.

Korean League 
Marte spent the 2015 and 2016 seasons with the KT Wiz of the KBO League.

Death 
Marte was killed in a car crash in the Dominican Republic on January 22, 2017. He was 33, and left behind four sons. Between San Francisco de Macorís and Pimentel, Marte had crashed into a house. Marte, who in the Dominican Republic was a team member of the Águilas Cibaeñas, died the same day as Yordano Ventura, who died in a separate car crash in the Dominican Republic at the age of 25.

See also 
 List of baseball players who died during their careers
 List of people from the Dominican Republic

References

External links 

Career statistics and player information from Korea Baseball Organization

1983 births
2017 deaths
Arizona Diamondbacks players
Atlanta Braves players
Buffalo Bisons (minor league) players
Cleveland Indians players
Danville Braves players
Dominican Republic expatriate baseball players in South Korea
Dominican Republic expatriate baseball players in the United States
Columbus Clippers players
Greenville Braves players
Gulf Coast Braves players
KBO League first basemen
KBO League third basemen
KT Wiz players
Indianapolis Indians players
Lake County Captains players

Major League Baseball players from the Dominican Republic
Major League Baseball third basemen
Macon Braves players
Myrtle Beach Pelicans players
Reno Aces players
Richmond Braves players
Road incident deaths in the Dominican Republic
Salt Lake Bees players
York Revolution players
Águilas Cibaeñas players
Azucareros del Este players
Leones del Escogido players
Tigres del Licey players
Toros del Este players